Mendota is an extinct town in Lewis County, in the U.S. state of Washington.

A post office called Mendota was established in 1909, and remained in operation until 1923. The community took its name from the Mendota Coal and Coke Company.

References

Ghost towns in Lewis County, Washington